Lygus wagneri is a species of plant bug belonging to the family Miridae, subfamily Mirinae.

Description
These bugs have a golden gray to olive brown coloration, with small reddish areas. Head shows longitudinal dark brown lines between the eyes. The antennae are greyish brown. Scutellum has a W-shaped dark drawing.

This species is extremely similar to Lygus pratensis, although on average it is slightly smaller, with a shorter membrane. The corium is less densely pubescent.

Biology
Lygus wagneri has two generations per year. It has an incomplete metamorphosis, the transition from newly hatched larvae to the sexually mature insects gradually goes through several stages. It is a polyphagous species, mainly feeding on nectar of Tanacetum vulgare and on juices of Asteraceae, Urtica dioica, Rumex obtusifolius, Hieracium and Hypericum.

Distribution and habitat
This species is widespread in most of Europe. It prefers meadows and open, uncultivated localities.

References

 Coulianos, C.-C. 1998. Annotated Catalogue of the Hemiptera-Heteroptera of Norway. Fauna Norwegia Ser.B 45 (1-2), side 11-39

Lygus
Insects described in 1955